Insulamon palawanense, or the Palawan purple crab is a species of freshwater crab from the Philippines described in 2012.

History
The species was described by Hendrik Freitag of the Senckenberg Museum of Zoology in Dresden, Germany, having previously been included in a wider circumscription of I. unicorn. The species is endemic to the island of Palawan, where it has a wide distribution. The striking iridescent purple coloration may help the crabs to recognise others of its species, or may serve no purpose.

References

Potamoidea
Freshwater crustaceans of Asia
Endemic fauna of the Philippines
Fauna of Palawan
Arthropods of the Philippines
Crustaceans described in 2012